The 1923–24 Kansas Jayhawks men's basketball team represented the University of Kansas during the 1923–24 college men's basketball season.

Roster
Tusten Ackerman
Wilferd Belgard
Vernon Engel
Henry Heckert
Daniel Stratton
Charlie T. Black

Schedule

References

Kansas Jayhawks men's basketball seasons
Kansas
Kansas
Kansas